Line 7 or 7 Line may refer to:

Transportation

Asia

China 
Line 7 (Beijing Subway), a subway line in Beijing
Line 7 (Chengdu Metro), a metro line in Chengdu, Sichuan
Line 7 (Guangzhou Metro), a metro line in Guangzhou, Guangdong
Line 7 (Hangzhou Metro), a metro line in Hangzhou, Zhejiang
Line 7 (Nanjing Metro), a metro line in Nanjing, Jiangsu
Line 7 (Shanghai Metro), a metro line in Shanghai
Line 7 (Shenzhen Metro), a metro line in Shenzhen, Guangdong
Line 7 (Suzhou Rail Transit), a planned lateral line of the branch of Line 4 in Suzhou, Jiangsu
Line 7 (Wuhan Metro), a line connecting Huangpi to Jiangxia, Wuhan, Hubei

India 
Line 7 (Mumbai Metro), a line under construction

Japan 
Line 7 (Osaka), the Nagahori Tsurumi-ryokuchi Line

Malaysia 
KLIA Transit, called Line 7 at route map

Philippines 
MRT Line 7 (Metro Manila)

South Korea 
Seoul Subway Line 7, a part of the Seoul Metropolitan Subway

Taiwan 
Line 7, Taipei Metro, the Wanda–Zhonghe–Shulin line

Europe

Hungary 
Line 7 (BHÉV), a rapid transit line in Budapest

France 
Île-de-France tramway Line 7, a part of the modern tram network of the Île-de-France region of France
Paris Métro Line 7, one of 16 metro lines of the Paris, France metro

Italy 
Line 7 (Naples metro), rapid transit railway line that forms part of the Metropolitana di Napoli

Russia 
Line 7 (Moscow Metro), a metro line of the Moscow Metro, Moscow, Russia

Spain 
Barcelona Metro line 7,  metro-like commuter train line in the Barcelona Metro
Line 7 (Madrid Metro), one of the 13 metro lines of the Madrid metro
Rodalies Barcelona line 7,  commuter rail in Barcelona metropolitan area, Catalonia, Spain

North America

Mexico 
Mexico City Metro Line 7, a rapid transit line in Mexico City

United States 
Route 7 (MTA Maryland), a bus route
 No. 7 Line (Baltimore streetcar), a former streetcar line to Govanstown
7 (New York City Subway service) Flushing Local/Express, two rapid transit services that run with each other
7 Subway Extension, an extension of the above service
 7 (Los Angeles Railway), a former streetcar line in Los Angeles

South America

Chile 
Santiago Metro Line 7, a line that is in planning

Brazil 
Line 7 (CPTM), a commuter rail line in São Paulo

See also 
The 7 Line Army, a group of fans of the New York Mets baseball team
7 Train (disambiguation)